Tanzeela Qambrani is a Pakistani politician who is a member of the Provincial Assembly of Sindh. She took her oath on August 13, 2018. Qambrani is the first woman of the Sheedi community to become a member of Sindh Assembly.

Political career
Qambrani was elected to the Provincial Assembly of Sindh as a candidate of the Pakistan Peoples Party (PPP), on a reserved seat for women in southern Sindh in the 2018 Pakistani general election.

Personal life
Qambrani hails from the coastal area of Badin. She belongs to the Sheedi community of Sindh, who are of African descent. She made history by becoming the first Sheedi lawmaker to enter any Pakistani legislature. She is a mother of three, and holds a postgraduate degree in computer science from the University of Sindh.

Her father was a lawyer while her mother retired as a school headmistress. According to Qambrani, her great-grandparents had been brought to Sindh from Tanzania a century back, and one of her sisters is married off there. Her rising profile and ascension to politics has been hailed as an "important step" for Pakistan's Sheedi community, which has at times endured systematic prejudice, discrimination and feudalism.

References

Living people
1979 births
Pakistani people of African descent
Sindh MPAs 2018–2023
Pakistan People's Party MPAs (Sindh)
Pakistani people of Tanzanian descent
People from Badin District
Siddhi people
University of Sindh alumni
Women members of the Provincial Assembly of Sindh
21st-century Pakistani women politicians